Lee Hwa-si (born July 22, 1951) is a South Korean actress. While Lee was attending Dongguk University with a major in Korean literature, she was cast to star in Ban Geum-ryeon directed by Kim Ki-young. Lee is commonly referred to as director Kim Ki-young's persona due to her frequent appearances in Kim's films during the 1970s. Lee's acting in Iodo (1977) especially is regarded as a good example to present her own character. But later, Lee's career declined and Lee retired.

Filmography
*Note; the whole list is referenced.
'

References

External links 
 
 

South Korean film actresses
1951 births
Living people